was a Japanese physician, active as medical doctor until age 104. At the time of his death at age , Hara had been the oldest living Japanese man for 109-year-old Nisaburo Matsuyama's death on 3 April 1991, and was succeeded as Japan's oldest living man by Gihei Oka.

References

1882 births
1991 deaths
Japanese physicians
Japanese centenarians
Men centenarians